Morum purpureum is a species of sea snail, a marine gastropod mollusk in the family Harpidae, the harp snails.

Description

Distribution
This species occurs in the Caribbean Sea off Belize.

References

 Dance, S.P. & G.T. Poppe, 1999 Family Harpidae. In : A Conchological Iconography (ConchBooks, ed.), 69 p.
 Turgeon, D.; Quinn, J.F.; Bogan, A.E.; Coan, E.V.; Hochberg, F.G.; Lyons, W.G.; Mikkelsen, P.M.; Neves, R.J.; Roper, C.F.E.; Rosenberg, G.; Roth, B.; Scheltema, A.; Thompson, F.G.; Vecchione, M.; Williams, J.D. (1998). Common and scientific names of aquatic invertebrates from the United States and Canada: mollusks. 2nd ed. American Fisheries Society Special Publication, 26. American Fisheries Society: Bethesda, MD (USA). . IX, 526 + cd-rom pp

Harpidae